The 2023 Los Angeles Angels season will be the 63rd season of the Los Angeles Angels franchise in the American League, the 58th in Anaheim, and their 58th season playing their home games at Angel Stadium.

Offseason
The Angels finished the 2022 season 74–88, 33 games out of first place. They missed the playoffs for the eighth consecutive season and now share the longest current playoff drought with the Tigers. Both teams have not made the playoffs since 2014.

Rule changes 
Pursuant to the CBA, new rule changes will be in place for the 2023 season:

 institution of a pitch clock between pitches;
 limits on pickoff attempts per plate appearance;
 limits on defensive shifts requiring two infielders to be on either side of second and be within the boundary of the infield; and
 larger bases (increased to 18-inch squares);

Regular season

Game Log  

|- style="background:
| 1 || March 30 || @ Athletics || – || || || — || || – || 
|- style="background: 
| 2 || April 1 || @ Athletics || – || || || — || || – || 
|- style="background: 
| 3 || April 2 || @ Athletics || – || || || — || || – ||
|- style="background: 
| 4 || April 3 || @ Mariners || – || || || — || || – ||
|- style="background: 
| 5 || April 4 || @ Mariners || – || || || — || || – ||
|- style="background: 
| 6 || April 5 || @ Mariners || – || || || — || || – ||
|- style="background: 
| 7 || April 7 || Blue Jays || – || || || — || || – ||
|- style="background: 
| 8 || April 8 || Blue Jays || – || || || — || || – ||
|- style="background: 
| 9 || April 9 || Blue Jays || – || || || — || || – ||
|- style="background: 
| 10 || April 10 || Nationals || – || || || — || || – ||
|- style="background: 
| 11 || April 11 || Nationals || – || || || — || || – ||
|- style="background: 
| 12 || April 12 || Nationals || – || || || — || || – ||
|- style="background: 
| 13 || April 14 || @ Red Sox || – || || || — || || – ||
|- style="background: 
| 14 || April 15 || @ Red Sox || – || || || — || || – ||
|- style="background: 
| 15 || April 16 || @ Red Sox || – || || || — || || – ||
|- style="background: 
| 16 || April 17 || @ Red Sox || – || || || — || || – ||
|- style="background: 
| 17 || April 18 || @ Yankees || – || || || — || || – ||
|- style="background: 
| 18 || April 19 || @ Yankees || – || || || — || || – ||
|- style="background: 
| 19 || April 20 || @ Yankees || – || || || — || || – ||
|- style="background: 
| 20 || April 21 || Royals || – || || || — || || – ||
|- style="background: 
| 21 || April 22 || Royals || – || || || — || || – ||
|- style="background: 
| 22 || April 23 || Royals || – || || || — || || – ||
|- style="background: 
| 23 || April 24 || Athletics || – || || || — || || – ||
|- style="background: 
| 24 || April 25 || Athletics || – || || || — || || – ||
|- style="background: 
| 25 || April 26 || Athletics || – || || || — || || – ||
|- style="background: 
| 26 || April 27 || Athletics || – || || || — || || – ||
|- style="background: 
| 27 || April 28 || @ Brewers || – || || || — || || – ||
|- style="background: 
| 28 || April 29 || @ Brewers || – || || || — || || – ||
|- style="background: 
| 29 || April 30 || @ Brewers || – || || || — || || – ||
|- 
 

|- style="background: 
| 30 || May 2 || @ Cardinals || – || || || — || || – ||
|- style="background: 
| 31 || May 3 || @ Cardinals || – || || || — || || – ||
|- style="background: 
| 32 || May 4 || @ Cardinals || – || || || — || || – ||
|- style="background: 
| 33 || May 5 || Rangers || – || || || — || || – ||
|- style="background: 
| 34 || May 6 || Rangers || – || || || — || || – ||
|- style="background: 
| 35 || May 7 || Rangers || – || || || — || || – ||
|- style="background: 
| 36 || May 8 || Astros || – || || || — || || – ||
|- style="background: 
| 37 || May 9 || Astros || – || || || — || || – ||
|- style="background: 
| 38 || May 10 || Astros || – || || || — || || – ||
|- style="background: 
| 39 || May 12 || @ Guardians || – || || || — || || – ||
|- style="background: 
| 40 || May 13 || @ Guardians || – || || || — || || – ||
|- style="background: 
| 41 || May 14 || @ Guardians || – || || || — || || – ||
|- style="background: 
| 42 || May 15 || @ Orioles || – || || || — || || – ||
|- style="background: 
| 43 || May 16 || @ Orioles || – || || || — || || – ||
|- style="background: 
| 44 || May 17 || @ Orioles || – || || || — || || – ||
|- style="background: 
| 45 || May 18 || @ Orioles || – || || || — || || – ||
|- style="background: 
| 46 || May 19 || Twins || – || || || — || || – ||
|- style="background: 
| 47 || May 20 || Twins || – || || || — || || – ||
|- style="background: 
| 48 || May 21 || Twins || – || || || — || || – ||
|- style="background: 
| 49 || May 22 || Red Sox || – || || || — || || – ||
|- style="background: 
| 50 || May 23 || Red Sox || – || || || — || || – ||
|- style="background: 
| 51 || May 24 || Red Sox || – || || || — || || – ||
|- style="background: 
| 52 || May 26 || Marlins || – || || || — || || – ||
|- style="background: 
| 53 || May 27 || Marlins || – || || || — || || – ||
|- style="background: 
| 54 || May 28 || Marlins || – || || || — || || – ||
|- style="background: 
| 55 || May 29 || @ White Sox || – || || || — || || – ||
|- style="background: 
| 56 || May 30 || @ White Sox || – || || || — || || – ||
|- style="background: 
| 57 || May 31 || @ White Sox || – || || || — || || – ||
|- 
 

|- style="background: 
| 58 || June 1 || @ Astros || – || || || — || || – ||
|- style="background: 
| 59 || June 2 || @ Astros || – || || || — || || – ||
|- style="background: 
| 60 || June 3 || @ Astros || – || || || — || || – ||
|- style="background: 
| 61 || June 4 || @ Astros || – || || || — || || – ||
|- style="background: 
| 62 || June 6 || Cubs || – || || || — || || – ||
|- style="background: 
| 63 || June 7 || Cubs || – || || || — || || – ||
|- style="background: 
| 64 || June 8 || Cubs || – || || || — || || – ||
|- style="background: 
| 65 || June 9 || Mariners || – || || || — || || – ||
|- style="background: 
| 66 || June 10 || Mariners || – || || || — || || – ||
|- style="background: 
| 67 || June 11 || Mariners || – || || || — || || – ||
|- style="background: 
| 68 || June 12 || @ Rangers || – || || || — || || – ||
|- style="background: 
| 69 || June 13 || @ Rangers || – || || || — || || – ||
|- style="background: 
| 70 || June 14 || @ Rangers || – || || || — || || – ||
|- style="background: 
| 71 || June 15 || @ Rangers || – || || || — || || – ||
|- style="background: 
| 72 || June 16 || @ Royals || – || || || — || || – ||
|- style="background: 
| 73 || June 17 || @ Royals || – || || || — || || – ||
|- style="background: 
| 74 || June 18 || @ Royals || – || || || — || || – ||
|- style="background: 
| 75 || June 20 || Dodgers || – || || || — || || – ||
|- style="background: 
| 76 || June 21 || Dodgers || – || || || — || || – ||
|- style="background: 
| 77 || June 23 || @ Rockies || – || || || — || || – ||
|- style="background: 
| 78 || June 24 || @ Rockies || – || || || — || || – ||
|- style="background: 
| 79 || June 25 || @ Rockies || – || || || — || || – ||
|- style="background: 
| 80 || June 26 || White Sox || – || || || — || || – ||
|- style="background: 
| 81 || June 27 || White Sox || – || || || — || || – ||
|- style="background: 
| 82 || June 28 || White Sox || – || || || — || || – ||
|- style="background: 
| 83 || June 29 || White Sox || – || || || — || || – ||
|- style="background: 
| 84 || June 30 || Diamondbacks || – || || || — || || – ||
|- 
 

|- style="background: 
| 85 || July 1 || Diamondbacks || – || || || — || || – ||
|- style="background: 
| 86 || July 2 || Diamondbacks || – || || || — || || – ||
|- style="background: 
| 87 || July 3 || @ Padres || – || || || — || || – ||
|- style="background: 
| 88 || July 4 || @ Padres || – || || || — || || – ||
|- style="background: 
| 89 || July 5 || @ Padres || – || || || — || || – ||
|- style="background: 
| 90 || July 7 || @ Dodgers || – || || || — || || – ||
|- style="background: 
| 91 || July 8 || @ Dodgers || – || || || — || || – ||
|- style="background:#bcf
| ASG || July 11 || NL @ AL || – || || || — || || ||
|- style="background: 
| 92 || July 14 || Astros || – || || || — || || – ||
|- style="background: 
| 93 || July 15 || Astros || – || || || — || || – ||
|- style="background: 
| 94 || July 16 || Astros || – || || || — || || – ||
|- style="background: 
| 95 || July 17 || Yankees || – || || || — || || – ||
|- style="background: 
| 96 || July 18 || Yankees || – || || || — || || – ||
|- style="background: 
| 97 || July 19 || Yankees || – || || || — || || – ||
|- style="background: 
| 98 || July 21 || Pirates || – || || || — || || – ||
|- style="background: 
| 99 || July 22 || Pirates || – || || || — || || – ||
|- style="background: 
| 100 || July 23 || Pirates || – || || || — || || – ||
|- style="background: 
| 101 || July 25 || @ Tigers || – || || || — || || – ||
|- style="background: 
| 102 || July 26 || @ Tigers || – || || || — || || – ||
|- style="background: 
| 103 || July 27 || @ Tigers || – || || || — || || – ||
|- style="background: 
| 104 || July 28 || @ Blue Jays || – || || || — || || – ||
|- style="background: 
| 105 || July 29 || @ Blue Jays || – || || || — || || – ||
|- style="background: 
| 106 || July 30 || @ Blue Jays || – || || || — || || – ||
|- style="background: 
| 107 || July 31 || @ Braves || – || || || — || || – ||
|- 
 

|- style="background: 
| 108 || August 1 || @ Braves || – || || || — || || – ||
|- style="background: 
| 109 || August 2 || @ Braves || – || || || — || || – ||
|- style="background: 
| 110 || August 3 || Mariners || – || || || — || || – ||
|- style="background: 
| 111 || August 4 || Mariners || – || || || — || || – ||
|- style="background: 
| 112 || August 5 || Mariners || – || || || — || || – ||
|- style="background: 
| 113 || August 6 || Mariners || – || || || — || || – ||
|- style="background: 
| 114 || August 7 || Giants || – || || || — || || – ||
|- style="background: 
| 115 || August 8 || Giants || – || || || — || || – ||
|- style="background: 
| 116 || August 9 || Giants || – || || || — || || – ||
|- style="background: 
| 117 || August 11 || @ Astros || – || || || — || || – ||
|- style="background: 
| 118 || August 12 || @ Astros || – || || || — || || – ||
|- style="background: 
| 119 || August 13 || @ Astros || – || || || — || || – ||
|- style="background: 
| 120 || August 14 || @ Rangers || – || || || — || || – ||
|- style="background: 
| 121 || August 15 || @ Rangers || – || || || — || || – ||
|- style="background: 
| 122 || August 16 || @ Rangers || – || || || — || || – ||
|- style="background: 
| 123 || August 18 || Rays || – || || || — || || – ||
|- style="background: 
| 124 || August 19 || Rays || – || || || — || || – ||
|- style="background: 
| 125 || August 20 || Rays || – || || || — || || – ||
|- style="background: 
| 126 || August 21 || Reds || – || || || — || || – ||
|- style="background: 
| 127 || August 22 || Reds || – || || || — || || – ||
|- style="background: 
| 128 || August 23 || Reds || – || || || — || || – ||
|- style="background: 
| 129 || August 25 || @ Mets || – || || || — || || – ||
|- style="background: 
| 130 || August 26 || @ Mets || – || || || — || || – ||
|- style="background: 
| 131 || August 27 || @ Mets || – || || || — || || – ||
|- style="background: 
| 132 || August 28 || @ Phillies || – || || || — || || – ||
|- style="background: 
| 133 || August 29 || @ Phillies || – || || || — || || – ||
|- style="background: 
| 134 || August 30 || @ Phillies || – || || || — || || – ||
|- 
 

|- style="background: 
| 135 || September 1 || @ Athletics || – || || || — || || – ||
|- style="background: 
| 136 || September 2 || @ Athletics || – || || || — || || – ||
|- style="background: 
| 137 || September 3 || @ Athletics || – || || || — || || – ||
|- style="background: 
| 138 || September 4 || Orioles || – || || || — || || – ||
|- style="background: 
| 139 || September 5 || Orioles || – || || || — || || – ||
|- style="background: 
| 140 || September 6 || Orioles || – || || || — || || – ||
|- style="background: 
| 141 || September 7 || Guardians || – || || || — || || – ||
|- style="background: 
| 142 || September 8 || Guardians || – || || || — || || – ||
|- style="background: 
| 143 || September 9 || Guardians || – || || || — || || – ||
|- style="background: 
| 144 || September 10 || Guardians || – || || || — || || – ||
|- style="background: 
| 145 || September 11 || @ Mariners || – || || || — || || – ||
|- style="background: 
| 146 || September 12 || @ Mariners || – || || || — || || – ||
|- style="background: 
| 147 || September 13 || @ Mariners || – || || || — || || – ||
|- style="background: 
| 148 || September 15 || Tigers || – || || || — || || – ||
|- style="background: 
| 149 || September 16 || Tigers || – || || || — || || – ||
|- style="background: 
| 150 || September 17 || Tigers || – || || || — || || – ||
|- style="background: 
| 151 || September 19 || @ Rays || – || || || — || || – ||
|- style="background: 
| 152 || September 20 || @ Rays || – || || || — || || – ||
|- style="background: 
| 153 || September 21 || @ Rays || – || || || — || || – ||
|- style="background: 
| 154 || September 22 || @ Twins || – || || || — || || – ||
|- style="background: 
| 155 || September 23 || @ Twins || – || || || — || || – ||
|- style="background: 
| 156 || September 24 || @ Twins || – || || || — || || – ||
|- style="background: 
| 157 || September 25 || Rangers || – || || || — || || – ||
|- style="background: 
| 158 || September 26 || Rangers || – || || || — || || – ||
|- style="background: 
| 159 || September 27 || Rangers || – || || || — || || – ||
|- style="background: 
| 160 || September 29 || Athletics || – || || || — || || – ||
|- style="background: 
| 161 || September 30 || Athletics || – || || || — || || – ||
|- style="background: 
| 162 || October 1 || Athletics || – || || || — || || – ||
|-

American League West

American League Wild Card

Roster

Farm system

All coaches and rosters can be found on each team's website.

See also
Los Angeles Angels
Angel Stadium

References

External links
Los Angeles Angels Official Site
2023 Los Angeles Angels season at Baseball Reference

Los Angeles Angels seasons
Los Angeles Angels
Los Angeles Angels